Pronghorn is a census-designated place (CDP) and resort community in Deschutes County, Oregon, United States. It is part of the Bend, Oregon Metropolitan Statistical Area. The residential population was 34 at the 2010 census.

Demographics

References

Census-designated places in Oregon
Unincorporated communities in Deschutes County, Oregon
Census-designated places in Deschutes County, Oregon
Unincorporated communities in Oregon